John Lee  was an English Anglican priest in the 17th century.

Lee was born in Surrey and educated at Magdalen College, Oxford. He held livings at Milton-next-Gravesend, Southfleet, and Bishopsbourne. Lee was archdeacon of Rochester from 1660 until his death on 12 June 1679.

Notes

17th-century English Anglican priests
Archdeacons of Rochester
People from Surrey
Alumni of Magdalen College, Oxford
1679 deaths
Year of birth missing
People from Milton, Kent